This is a list of notable events relating to the environment in 1965. They relate to environmental law, conservation, environmentalism and environmental issues.

Events

October
 US President Lyndon B. Johnson signed the National Emissions Standards Act, an amendment to the Clean Air Act of 1963. The amendment set the first federal vehicle emissions standards.

References

1965 in the environment